The Zambezi indigobird (Vidua codringtoni), also known as the twinspot indigobird or green indigobird, is a species of bird in the family Viduidae. It is found in Malawi, Tanzania, Zambia, and Zimbabwe.

It appears on Zambia's new 5 ngwee coin.

References

Zambezi indigobird
Birds of East Africa
Zambezi indigobird
Taxonomy articles created by Polbot